Starotimoshkino (İśke Timeşkä) is a rural locality (a village) in Urshaksky Selsoviet, Aurgazinsky District, Bashkortostan, Russia. The population was 53 as of 2010. There are 2 streets.

Geography 
Starotimoshkino is located 32 km northwest of Tolbazy (the district's administrative centre) by road. Novoyanbekovo is the nearest rural locality.

References 

Rural localities in Aurgazinsky District